Sydney Entertainment Centre (later known as Qantas Credit Union Arena) was a multi-purpose arena located in Haymarket, Sydney, Australia. It opened in May 1983, to replace Sydney Stadium, which had been demolished in 1970 to make way for the Eastern Suburbs railway line. The centre was owned by the Sydney Harbour Foreshore Authority, which administered the neighbouring Darling Harbour area, and managed under a lease.

It was one of Sydney's larger concert venues, licensed to accommodate over 13,000 people as a conventional theatre or 8,000 as a theatre-in-the-round. It was the largest permanent concert venue in Sydney until 1999, when the Sydney Super Dome opened at Sydney Olympic Park. The venue averaged attendances of 1 million people each year and hosted concerts, family shows, sporting events and corporate events. It closed the month before its demolition in January 2016.

Construction
Sydney Entertainment Centre was built by John Holland Group and opened in 1983.

Notable events

In December 1983, Cold Chisel played its final Last Stand concert.

In April 1984, Linda Ronstadt and the Nelson Riddle Orchestra performed What’s New.

In April 1985, Phil Collins performed five shows as part of The No Jacket Required World Tour, and Queen performed four shows as part of The Works Tour.

On 13 July 1985, the Oz for Africa concert was held. It was broadcast locally and internationally as part of the worldwide Live Aid performances to raise money for famine relief in Africa. 17 bands performed including INXS, Little River Band, Mental As Anything, Men at Work, The Angels, Australian Crawl, Dragon, Mondo Rock, Models and Renée Geyer.

Elton John has played numerous concerts there over the years, including eight dates in 1986 with an orchestra at Haymarket Arena. The latter shows were the last he performed prior to throat surgery. He has played 46 shows at the venue and was final artist to perform at the venue before its demolition in December 2015.

John Farnham finished his run of a record 76 concerts at the venue over three decades with a farewell gig 16 December 2015. He joked he got to take home the 6-foot entrance sign to the green room, dubbed 'The Farnham Room'.

The Wiggles gave 84 performances at the venue, including the classic line-up's final show on 23 December 2012. The footage from their various tours were later used for some of their videos.

In 1986, Dire Straits finished its 1985–86 world tour by playing 21 consecutive shows at the venue.

Also in 1986, Elton John performed the last leg of his Tour De Force with the Melbourne Symphony Orchestra at the venue, playing 12 shows. Part of the last show, (performed on 14 December) was to be made into his next album, Live in Australia with the Melbourne Symphony Orchestra.

Genesis played nine dates at the 1986 leg of the Invisible Touch Tour (25–27 November and 15–20 December). Some of the songs were performed with an Australian string section. Archives 2 – disc 2 holds a version of "Your Own Special Way" recorded at SEC.

British pop/rock duo Eurythmics filmed "Eurythmics Live" during their Revenge Tour at Sydney Entertainment Centre in Sydney, Australia on 14 February 1987.

Bon Jovi performed 12 concerts at the venue throughout their career, including 5 consecutive nights during their Slippery When Wet Tour in 1987.

Billy Idol performed here in September 1987 as part of The Whiplash Smile Australasian Tour.

David Bowie recorded his performances on 7 and 9 November 1987 from his worldwide Glass Spider Tour for release on video and CD at the Entertainment Centre.

On 16 and 17 November 1990 Eric Clapton two sold-out concerts in front of 26,500 people during his Journeyman World Tour.

On 12 March 1994 Depeche Mode performed their last show from the Australian Exotic Tour/Summer Tour '94, as of 2015, it has been their last concert in the country.

Janet Jackson performed on 10, 11, 12 and 15 February 1995 for her Janet World Tour, and again on 16 December 1998 for her The Velvet Rope Tour.

American rock band Pearl Jam played two nights in 1995 (10–11 March) during the Vitalogy Tour, three nights (9, 11, 12 March 1998) during the Yield Tour and another three nights (11, 13, 14 February 2003) at the venue during the Riot Act Tour.

Two of The Beatles have performed at the venue: Paul McCartney for three sellout shows in March 1993, and George Harrison made a surprise appearance at a Deep Purple concert in 1984. Deep Purple would continue to return to the venue during the late 1990s, and early 2000s up until 2004 on the Bananas and Rapture of the Deep tour, but would later return as they kicked off their 2010 World Tour on 28 April and early Now What?! World Tour of 2013 on 2 March. US rockers Journey supported them marking their first tour of Australia of that year also.

Gloria Estefan performed 4 shows on 11, 12, 14 and 15 November 1991 for her Into The Light World Tour and on 10, 12 and 13 April 1997 for her Evolution World Tour.

Mariah Carey performed on 2 and 6 February 1998, for her Butterfly World Tour, a one-off concert in January 2013, and again on 10 November 2014 for The Elusive Chanteuse Show.

Shania Twain performed there on 12 and 13 February 1999, for her Come On Over Tour.

The cream of Australian music, almost every major music act of the time, including INXS, The Angels, The Divinyls, Dragon, The Saints and Roger Waters performed two shows during his In The Flesh Tour on 5, and 6 April 2002.

On 28 July 2004 The Who performed their first concert in Australia since 1968.

Cher performed three shows during her Living Proof: The Farewell Tour on 3, 4 and 7 March 2005.

Kylie Minogue has played 25 concerts there, she finished her On A Night Like This Tour, after playing 11 nights there and kicked off her Showgirl: The Homecoming Tour in November 2006. On 20 March 2015, Minogue performed as part of her Kiss Me Once Tour.

Pop rock superstar P!nk performed (a then record-breaking) seven shows there during her 2007 I'm Not Dead Tour. In 2009, with her Funhouse Tour, in support of the number one album, she played a record 12 shows. She recorded her current live DVD at the SEC.

It also hosted international circuses and shows, such as Disney on Ice and Hugh Jackman's The Boy from Oz.

Billy Thorpe's (Billy Thorpe & the Aztecs) Memorial Service was held here on 4 March 2007.  A crowd of 7000 family, friends and fans gathered to hear Speeches and bittersweet yarns from the musician's friends and musical tributes came from Max Merritt, with a rendition of Slipping Away from Me and Olivia Newton-John with Over the Rainbow.

It was used annually for the Schools Spectacular, which features over 3,000 young performers from across NSW as well as the Rock Eisteddfod Challenge.

Asian pop legend, "God of Songs" Jacky Cheung on 1 October 2011, as part of his Jacky Cheung 1/2 Century World Tour.

In 2011 and 2012, it played host to the Sydney judges' audition stages of the Seven Network singer search programme The X Factor.

In June 2013, the venue was host to four sold-out performances of the Andrew Lloyd Webber rock opera Jesus Christ Superstar.

In December 2013, the centre was to host a Bon Jovi concert. It was the band's first show in the Sydney Entertainment Centre after many stadium concerts across Australia.

In January 2014, Canadian indie rock band Arcade Fire performed the second headline show of its Reflektor world tour at the venue to a sell-out audience.

On 8 March 2014, American pop star Bruno Mars performed at the venue in front of a sold-out crowd for his Moonshine Jungle Tour.

On 12 and 13 September 2014, American rapper Kanye West performed at the venue for his The Yeezus Tour.

During November 2014 David Attenborough hosted The Third Dimension; which was an intimate talk show featuring his shows from early to present in 3D for the first time.  Audience were provided with special 3D Glasses, presented by Ray Martin.

On 14 February 2015, Laura Pausini made her first visit to Australia with The Greatest Hits World Tour.

Roxette would perform what would be known as their final performance in Sydney on 27 February 2015, weeks before lead singer Marie Fredriksson announced she would retire from touring due to her ongoing illnesses, abruptly ending their 30th anniversary XXX World Tour.

Sporting events
As a sporting venue, the SEC was best known as the home venue of the Sydney Kings who play in the National Basketball League (NBL) over 3 stints. The Kings moved from the smaller (5,006 capacity) State Sports Centre in Homebush Bay in 1990 and remained until moving to the Super Dome in 1999. The Kings then returned to the SEC in 2002 and would enjoy immediate success winning the NBL championship in 2002–03, 2003–04 and 2004–05. The team remained until 2008 when they folded due to financial difficulties, but when the club returned to the NBL in 2010 they again made the SEC their home which lasted until the centre's closing in 2015.

In 1995, the Entertainment Centre hosted Game 4 of a 5-game international basketball series between the Australian Boomers and the Magic Johnson All-Stars in front of a sellout crowd of almost 12,000 fans. Despite the All-Stars being a collection of former NBA players, and with Magic Johnson not playing due to a calf injury, the crowd was actually behind the All-Stars on the night. They were treated to a game that went into overtime with the All-Stars keeping their unbeaten record intact with a 97–94 win. Before the game Magic Johnson apologised to the fans from centre court for not being able to play and called the SEC "A good sized gym that they can be proud of".

Other sports such as boxing, professional wrestling, tennis and indoor motor-cross have also been held. Australian boxer Jeff Fenech won a number of World title matches at the centre during the 1980s, While in July 2011, the IBO Cruiser-weight title match between Antonio Tarver and Danny Green took place at the SEC.

The SEC hosted the 1991 World Netball Championships, as well as games during the 1994 FIBA Women's World Championship including all Finals games and 3rd place playoff game.

At the 2000 Summer Olympics, the SEC was the venue for volleyball.

Further, the facility co-hosted the FIBA Oceania Championship in 2007 and 2011. Both times, the Australian national basketball team won the gold medal.

Closure
As part of a redevelopment of the Darling Harbour precinct, the Sydney Entertainment Centre was demolished in early 2016. The Darling Square residential development replaced the centre. Replacement facilities were built closer towards the harbour surrounding the Darling Quarter and contains a larger theatre with a seating capacity of 8,000, an exhibition centre and convention centre that is expected to be the largest in the world. The opening of the new facilities occurred in late 2016.

It was originally to be demolished in 2013, along with the surrounding buildings, but was granted a reprieve. The final concerts were played by Cold Chisel and Elton John on the weekend of 18/19 December 2015. Demolition began on January 2016 and was replaced as an inner city venue by the nearby 9,000-seat International Convention Centre Sydney Theatre, as part of a $3 billion redevelopment of Darling Harbour.

References

External links

 
 

Event venues established in 1983
1983 establishments in Australia
Sports venues in Sydney
Music venues in Sydney
Defunct basketball venues in Australia
Defunct National Basketball League (Australia) venues
Tennis venues in Australia
Boxing venues in Australia
Volleyball venues in Australia
Olympic volleyball venues
Venues of the 2000 Summer Olympics
Sydney Kings
Sydney Uni Flames
2015 disestablishments in Australia
Sports venues demolished in 2016
Haymarket, New South Wales
Demolished buildings and structures in Sydney
Defunct indoor arenas in Australia
Demolished sports venues